The 1927 European Amateur Boxing Championships were held in Berlin, Germany from 16 to 20 May. It was the second edition of the competition, organised by the European governing body for amateur boxing, EABA. There were 50 fighters from 13 countries participating.

Medal winners

Medal table

References

External links
European Championships
Results
EABA Boxing

European Amateur Boxing Championships
Boxing
European Amateur Boxing Championships
International boxing competitions hosted by Germany
Sports competitions in Berlin
1920s in Berlin
Boxing in Germany
European Amateur Boxing Championships